VA Southern Nevada Healthcare System is a Veterans Affairs hospital that opened on August 14, 2012 and is located at 6900 North Pecos Road in North Las Vegas, Nevada. This was the first newly constructed VA hospital to open since 1995 and cost $600 million.

The facility will provide 90 beds, a 120-bed nursing home and an outpatient care center.  Located on a  site and will contain over  once it's fully functional.

History
The hospital was formally dedicated on August 6, 2012 and services were added over the remainder in 2012 and the facility was able to provide all planned services.

Access
In addition to car and van service, the Regional Transportation Commission offers service on the DVX route from the Bonneville Transit Center.

References

2012 establishments in Nevada
Buildings and structures in North Las Vegas, Nevada
Government buildings completed in 2012
Hospital buildings completed in 2012
Hospitals established in 2012
Hospitals in the Las Vegas Valley
Veterans Affairs medical facilities